Louis Bennison (October 17, 1884 – June 9, 1929) was an American stage and silent film actor, known for westerns. Born in Oakland, he attended the University of California, and performed in plays such as The Unchastened Woman and Johnny Get Your Gun. He had starring film roles and made his motion picture debut in the silent film Damaged Goods in 1914, other films included Pretty Mrs. Smith (1915), Oh, Johnny! (1918) and as the titular character in Speedy Meade (1919). 

In the 1920s, Bennison developed a relationship with Broadway actress Margaret Lawrence, and on June 9, 1929, the two were found dead in Lawrence's New York apartment, the result of a murder–suicide by firearm. Police believed the incident was alcohol-related.

Filmography
Damaged Goods - Dr. Clifford (1914)
The Keeper of the Flock (1915) (film short)
Pretty Mrs. Smith - Mr. Smith No. 1, Ferdinand (1915)
Oh, Johnny! - Johnny Burke (1918)
Sandy Burke of the U-Bar-U - Sandy Burke (1919)
Speedy Meade - Speedy Meade (1919)
The Road Called Straight - Al Boyd (1919)
High Pockets - 'High Pockets' Henderson (1919)
A Misfit Earl  - Jim Dunn (1919)
Lavender and Old Lace - Captain Charles Winfield / Carl Winfield (1921)

References

External links

1884 births
1929 deaths
American male silent film actors
20th-century American male actors
American male stage actors
Male actors from Oakland, California
Suicides by firearm in New York City
Murder–suicides in the United States
1929 suicides
American murderers